The Massacre Range is a mountain range in Washoe County, Nevada, USA. The range is partly within the High Rock Canyon Wilderness.

References 

Mountain ranges of Washoe County, Nevada
Mountain ranges of Nevada